Kim Wilkinson (born 21 March 1961) is a British former swimmer. She competed in the women's 200 metre backstroke at the 1976 Summer Olympics.

References

External links
 

1961 births
Living people
British female swimmers
Olympic swimmers of Great Britain
Swimmers at the 1976 Summer Olympics
Place of birth missing (living people)
British female backstroke swimmers
20th-century British women